George Albert Lenne (20 February 1916 – 15 February 2014) was an Australian rules footballer who played with Melbourne in the Victorian Football League (VFL).

Notes

External links 

George Lenne's playing statistics from The VFA Project

1916 births
2014 deaths
Australian rules footballers from Melbourne
Melbourne Football Club players
Camberwell Football Club players
People from Surrey Hills, Victoria